Cephalobarus macrocephalus is only species in the monotypic genus Cephalobarus of straight-snouted weevils belonging to the family Brentidae. This species is present in South America.

References 

 ITIS Report
 Biolib
 EoL
 Global Species

Brentidae
Beetles described in 1840